Abbs  is an airport serving the town of Abbs in Yemen.

See also
Transport in Yemen

References

External links
 OurAirports - Yemen
  Great Circle Mapper - Abbs
 Abbs

Airports in Yemen